The National Pub of the Year is an annual competition held by CAMRA, the winner of which is announced in the February of the year following that in which the competition is run, that finds the best pub in the UK. Established in 1988, the competition helps to highlight quality pubs around the UK that are worth seeking out and visiting. Each year, each local CAMRA branch nominates one pub in their area to be entered. These 200 pubs then go through to the regional competition, which then whittles down to 4 pubs to go to the national final.

The pubs in the national final are evaluated on:
Quality of the Real Ales served
Value for money
Atmosphere
Interior decoration
Customer service and welcome

Winners
2023: (announced November 2023)
2022: The Tamworth Tap, Tamworth, Staffordshire
2021: Competition cancelled due to COVID-19 pandemic
2020: Competition cancelled due to COVID-19 pandemic
2019: The Bell Inn, Aldworth, Berkshire
2018: Wonston Arms, Wonston, Hampshire
2017: Cricketers Arms, St Helens, Merseyside 
2016: George & Dragon, Hudswell, North Yorkshire
2015: Sandford Park Alehouse, Cheltenham, Gloucestershire
2014: The Salutation Inn, Ham, Gloucestershire
2013: The Swan with Two Necks, Pendleton, Lancashire
2012: The Baum, Rochdale, Greater Manchester
2011: The Bridge End Inn, Ruabon, Wrexham
2010: The Harp, Charing Cross, London
2009: The Kelham Island Tavern, Sheffield, South Yorkshire
2008: The Kelham Island Tavern, Sheffield, South Yorkshire
2007: Old Spot Inn, Hill Road, Dursley, Gloucestershire
2006: Tom Cobley Tavern, Spreyton, Devon
2005: The Swan, Little Totham, Essex
2004: The Fat Cat, Norwich, Norfolk
2003: The Crown & Thistle, Gravesend, Kent
2002: The Swan, Little Totham, Essex
2001: The Nursery Inn, Heaton Norris, Greater Manchester
2000: Blisland Inn, Blisland, Cornwall
1999: The Rising Sun, Tipton, West Midlands
1998: The Fat Cat, Norwich, Norfolk
1997: The Sair Inn, Linthwaite, Huddersfield, West Yorkshire
1996: Halfway House, Pitney, Somerset
1995: Coalbrookdale Inn, Coalbrookdale, Shropshire
1994: Beamish Mary Inn, No Place, between Stanley and Beamish, Co Durham
1993: Three Kings, Hanley Castle, Worcestershire & The Fishermans Tavern, Broughty Ferry, Angus
1992: (No Result)
1991: Great Western, Wolverhampton, West Midlands
1990: The Bell Inn, Aldworth, Berkshire
1989: Cap & Feathers, Tillingham, Essex
1988: The Boars Head, Kinmuck, Aberdeenshire

Regional winners

2022

2011

2010

2009

2008

2007

2005

2004

Runners-up
2010:
Taps, Lytham St Annes, Lancashire
Beacon Hotel, Sedgley, West Midlands
Salutation, Ham, near Berkeley, Gloucestershire
2009:
Royal Oak Inn, Wantage, Oxon
Crown Hotel, Worthington, Greater Manchester
Royal Oak, Friday Street, West Sussex
2008:
The Crown, Stockport, Greater Manchester
Tom Cobley Tavern, Spreyton, Devon
Royal Oak, Rusper, West Sussex
2007:
Turks Head, St Helens, Merseyside
Land of Liberty, Peace and Plenty, Heronsgate, Hertfordshire
Blue Peter Hotel, Kirkcolm, Dumfries & Galloway
2006:
Failford Inn, Failford, Ayrshire
West Riding Refreshment Rooms, Dewsbury railway station, Dewsbury, West Yorkshire
Dove Street Inn, Ipswich, East Anglia
2005:
The Check Inn, North Wroughton, Wiltshire
Old Coach House, Southwell, East Midlands
Robin Hood, Jarrow, Tyne & Wear
2004:
Arden Arms, Stockport, Greater Manchester
New Inn, Halse, Somerset
Olde Swan, Netherton, West Midlands
1998:
Brewery Arms, Keighley
Number 22, Darlington
Plough and Harrow, Monknash, Glamorgan
1997:
Blacksmith's Arms, Calbourne, Isle of Wight
Railway, Yorton, Shropshire
Pot Kiln, Frilsham, Berkshire
Boat Inn, Ashleworth, Gloucestershire

See also
Heritage pub
 List of public house topics
Pub Design Awards

References

External links
CAMRA - Pub Awards
CAMRA - Awards results
Winners List - CAMRA

Annual events in the United Kingdom
Awards established in 1988
British awards
Competitions in the United Kingdom
Hospitality industry awards
Hospitality industry in the United Kingdom
Pubs in the United Kingdom
1988 establishments in the United Kingdom